Bas Ent (born 28 September 1987 in Zaanstad) is a Dutch footballer.

Club career
Ent made his professional debut for FC Volendam on 21 April 2006 in an Eerste Divisie away match against Helmond Sport. Ent played ten games during his three-year professional contract in which he did not score. He also had a serious knee injury during his time with FC Volendam which curtailed his progress. He then joined VV Katwijk in 2009 and attended a college program at the Johan Cruyff University.

From May to July 2010, Ent played in the USL Premier Development League in the United States for the Dayton Dutch Lions appearing in 16 league matches in which he scored 2 goals and assisted on 6 others. During his time with Dayton, Ent attracted the interest of several Major League Soccer clubs, and in July 2010, he was given trials with Major League Soccer teams Toronto FC and Columbus Crew. He appeared for Toronto FC in an international friendly against Bolton Wanderers in 2010.

In January 2011, Ent rejoined Toronto FC on trial for their pre-season in Antalya, Turkey. On 20 March 2011 he signed with Topklasse club FC Lisse and continued playing in the Dutch top amateur leagues.

International career
Ent played six times for the Netherlands U-17, but never made it to a senior squad.

References

1987 births
Living people
Footballers from Zaanstad
Association football midfielders
Dutch footballers
FC Volendam players
VV Katwijk players
Dayton Dutch Lions players
FC Lisse players
Amsterdamsche FC players
VV DOVO players
USL League Two players
Dutch expatriate sportspeople in the United States
Expatriate soccer players in the United States
AGOVV Apeldoorn players
ODIN '59 players
Dutch expatriate footballers